Robert Murray Brown (April 1, 1911 – August 3, 1990) was a professional baseball pitcher. He played all or part of seven seasons in Major League Baseball, from 1930 until 1936, all for the Boston Braves/Bees.

In 7 MLB seasons, Brown compiled a 16–21 win–loss record, striking out 159 and walking 193, with an ERA of 4.48.

Brown died August 3, 1990, aged 79.

References

External links

Major League Baseball pitchers
Boston Braves players
Boston Bees players
Springfield Senators players
Binghamton Triplets players
Albany Senators players
Syracuse Chiefs players
Baseball players from Massachusetts
1911 births
1990 deaths